Aerocóndor Colombia (legally Aerovías Cóndor de Colombia S.A.) was a Colombian airline headquartered in Barranquilla, Colombia.

History

Early operations

Aerocóndor Colombia was founded by six former LANSA and Avianca pilots; Gustavo Lopez, Luis Donado, Eduardo Gonzalez, Juan B. Millon, Captain Julio Martin Florez, and Enrique Hanaberg, in association with two businessmen who together perceived an opportunity to establish a new airline to fly cargo from Colombia's northern industrial city of Barranquilla throughout the republic. Scheduled cargo services commenced on October 7, 1955 using Curtiss C-46s which were later complemented with Douglas C-47s. Progressive expansion saw most of these aircraft later reconfigured for passenger services, and Douglas C-54 and DC-6 were acquired during the early 1960s. International services between Barranquilla and Miami commenced during 1963. On May 1, 1969, the airline began re-equipping with L-188 Electras acquired from American Airlines. The Electras gradually replaced the airline's fleet of classic piston engine aircraft in the early 1970s.

Jet operations

Aerocóndor entered the jet age in December of 1972, purchasing an ex-American Airlines Boeing 720B. A Canadair CC-106 Yukon was also acquired for freight services in 1972 and a second ex-American Boeing 720B was added to the fleet in 1974. Introduction of jetliners modernized the airline's image and enabled it to begin operating jet services to Aruba, Curaçao, Guatemala City, Santo Domingo, Panama, and Port-au-Prince whilst also increasing the frequency of Miami services from Medellin, Bogotá, and San Andres. In 1975, financial control of Aerocóndor passed from the company's foundation management to Jorge Barco Vargas, formerly an Aerocivil chairman and the brother of a former president of the republic. A new orange and yellow colour scheme was applied to some aircraft, including the Boeing 720s, from 1975.

By this time, Aerocóndor had become a respected airline and was considered Colombia's second international airline. It also began to compete internationally with the country's national airline Avianca, to the concerns of both air traffic management and political representatives who wanted to protect Avianca's interests. By this stage Aerocóndor had grown to become Colombia's second international airline, and it was competing against the country's national flag carrier Avianca Colombia.

In 1977, the airline entered the wide-body era when it acquired a factory fresh Airbus A300, named "Ciudad de Barranquilla" in honor of the company's port of origin. This was the first A300 operated within the Latin American region, entering service on highly competitive routes to Miami. Plans for the introduction of a second A300 failed to materialize due to fiscal underachievement under the airline's new management. The financially strapped carrier soon entered a period of major crisis, due to poor control and internal corruption rather than market forces.

Decline
The company entered into a financial crisis due to the delay of four monthly payments for the A300, which forced the company to return the aircraft to Airbus. Aerocóndor was again sold in 1979 to the Cotes and Calderon brothers. The new president of the airline managed to overcome the crisis and recover the wide body aircraft. However, the financial state declined and the company was again in crisis. On April 24, 1980, liquidation was ordered and Aerocóndor ceased operations on June 16, 1980. Hope remained that services would be reinstated, but negotiations between the pilots, liquidators and the Colombian government were unsuccessful. Over the years, several of the pensioners of the airline had protested countless times demanding payment, overdue since the liquidation of the company. The airline's B707s and B720s were eventually stricken from the Colombian civil air register.

Destinations

National

Barranquilla (Ernesto Cortissoz International Airport) Hub
Barrancabermeja (Yariguíes Airport)
Bogota (El Dorado International Airport) Hub
Cali (Alfonso Bonilla Aragón International Airport)
Cartagena (Rafael Núñez International Airport)
Cimitarra (Cimitarra Airport)
Cúcuta (Camilo Daza International Airport)
Ibague (Perales Airport)
Maicao (Jorge Isaacs Airport)
Mariquita (Mariquita Airport)
Medellin (Enrique Olaya Herrera Airport)
Neiva (Benito Salas Airport)
Pereira (Matecaña International Airport)
Riohacha (Almirante Padilla Airport)
San Andrés (Gustavo Rojas Pinilla International Airport)
Santa Marta (Simon Bolivar International Airport)
Tibú (Tibú Airport)
Tolú (Golfo de Morrosquillo Airport)
Turbo (Gonzalo Mejía Airport)
Valledupar (Alfonso López Pumarejo Airport)
Velázquez (Velasquez Airport)

International

Oranjestad (Queen Beatrix International Airport)

Willemstad (Curaçao International Airport)

Santo Domingo (Las Américas International Airport)

Guatemala City (La Aurora International Airport)

Puerto Príncipe (Toussaint Louverture International Airport)

 Panama City (Tocumen International Airport)

Miami (Miami International Airport)

Fleet

Aerocóndor Colombia operated the following aircraft types at various times over the years:

Accidents and incidents
On December 18, 1966, a Lockheed L-1649A Starliner (registered N7301C), hit 10 to 20 meters from the runway on its flight from Miami to Bogota. At the time of the accident, there were clouds of fog over parts of the airport. The captain of the aircraft leased from the USA did not have a valid certificate of fitness to fly. Of the 59 people on board, 17 died.

On March 16, 1969, a Douglas DC-6 (registered HK-754) was hijacked by a passenger shortly after takeoff from Gustavo Rojas Pinilla International Airport. The hijacked demanded the pilot to be flown to Cuba and diverted the plane to Ignacio Agramonte International Airport.

On August 27, 1973, a Lockheed L-188A Electra (registered HK-777) was destroyed when it flew into the side of the Cerro el Cable mountain shortly after takeoff from El Dorado International Airport. All 36 passengers and 6 crew members died.

On February 22, 1975, a Canadair CC-106 Yukon (registered HK-1972) hit a tree 10 kilometers from the departure of El Dorado International Airport and fell 1,200 meters further into a mountain. All five crew members of the cargo plane were killed.

On July 10, 1975, a Lockheed L-188A Electra (registered HK-1976) suddenly turned right shortly after taking off from El Dorado International Airport, sank back and crashed into an Aerocosta Douglas DC-6 (HK-756). Both planes caught fire and were destroyed. Two of the four crew members on board the Electra were killed.

See also
List of defunct airlines of Colombia

References

External links
Aviacol-Aviación 100% Colombiana
Airline History website
Colombia's Colorful aerocóndor

Defunct airlines of Colombia
Airlines established in 1955
Airlines disestablished in 1980
1955 establishments in Colombia
Defunct companies of Colombia